Amor Quédate (English: Love Stay) Is the debut single released by Cuban-American singer-songwriter and actor Jencarlos Canela, written and produced by Rudy Pérez, from his upcoming debut studio album Búscame (2009). The song is one of the themes from Telemundo Telenovela's Más Sabe el Diablo.

Jencarlos thought this was a good romantic theme love song, to promote his new album.

Charts

Single
 Amor Quédate (Album Version) – 3:41

iTunes Single – EP 
iTunes Official Released 

 Amor Quédate (Album Version) – 3:41
 Amor Quédate (Unplugged Version) – 3:39
 Amor Quédate (Music Video) – 3:41

Official Versions & Remixes 

 Amor Quédate (Album Version) – 3:41
 Amor Quédate (Club Version) – 3:34
 Amor Quédate (Unplugged Version) – 3:41
 Amor Quédate (Salsa Version) – 4:50

References

External links 
 Jencarlos Canela lanza en las radios de Estados Unidos "Amor Quédate", primer sencillo de su álbum debut "Búscame"

2009 singles
2009 songs
Songs written by Rudy Pérez
Song recordings produced by Rudy Pérez
2000s ballads
Pop ballads